This is a list of municipalities in Kenya which have standing links to local communities in other countries. In most cases, the association, especially when formalised by local government, is known as "town twinning" (usually in Europe) or "sister cities" (usually in the rest of the world).

B
Bomet
 Milwaukee, United States

Bura
 Newburyport, United States

E
Eldoret

 Ithaca, United States
 Minneapolis, United States
 Portsmouth, United States

Esabalu
 Amesbury, United States

K
Kabarnet
 Hürth, Germany

Kisumu

 Boulder, United States
 Roanoke, United States

M
Marsabit
 Hinesville, United States

Mombasa

 Durban, South Africa
 Fuzhou, China
 Guangzhou, China
 Honolulu, United States
 Long Beach, United States
 Seattle, United States

N
Nairobi

 Addis Ababa, Ethiopia
 Denver, United States
 Kunming, China
 Lowell, United States
 Raleigh, United States
 São Luís, Brazil

Nyeri
 Amherst, United States

T
Taveta
 Melhus, Norway

Thika
 Dixon, United States

U
Uasin Gishu
 Scottsdale, United States

W
Wajir
 Haliliye, Turkey

References

Kenya
Populated places in Kenya
Foreign relations of Kenya
Kenya geography-related lists